Nur Alivand Kar (also Romanized as Nūr ‘Alīvand Kār; also known as Nūr ‘Alīvand Kār-e ‘Abd ol Ḩoseyn) is a village in Afrineh Rural District, Mamulan District, Pol-e Dokhtar County, Lorestan Province, Iran. At the 2006 census, its population was 45, in 7 families.

References 

Towns and villages in Pol-e Dokhtar County